Gasparini is an Italian surname and may refer to:

 Francesco Gasparini (1668–1727), or simply "Gasparini," Italian composer 
 Gaspare Gasparini (died 1590), Italian painter
 Graziano Gasparini (1924–2019), Venezuelan architect
 John Gasparini (fl. 1978–2009), former hockey coach and president of the United States Hockey League
 Marten Gasparini (born 1997), Italian baseball player
 Mitja Gasparini (born 1984), Slovenian volleyball player
 Quirino Gasparini (1721–1778), Italian composer
 Zulma Brandoni de Gasparini, Argentine palaeontologist

See also 
 Gasbarini, a minor planet
 Foucher-Gasparini, a French mechanical organ building company
 Gasparinisaura, a genus of dinosaur from the Late Cretaceous